Philip Russell Rea, 2nd Baron Rea, PC (7 February 1900 – 22 April 1981) was a British hereditary peer, Liberal politician and merchant banker.

The eldest son of Walter Rea, a Liberal politician, and his first wife, Evelyn, Rea was educated at Westminster School, and then at Christ Church, Oxford University, where he graduated BA and later MA, and lastly at the University of Grenoble.

In 1918, during the closing stages of the First World War, he served as a second lieutenant in the Grenadier Guards. During the Second World War he returned to the British Army and served as personal staff officer to Brigadier Colin Gubbins, Head of the Special Operations Executive, a key British intelligence and guerrilla operations agency. He was an officer of the King's Royal Rifle Corps.

Lord Rea served as Leader of the Liberal Party in the House of Lords from 1955 to 1967. In the Lords he had been Chief Liberal Whip from 1950 to 1955, a Deputy Speaker from 1954, and Deputy Chairman of Committees 1950 to 1955. He was president of the Liberal Party between 1955 and 1956, and a party vice-president from 1970. He was made a Privy Councillor in 1962.

Rea married Lorna Smith (died 11 December 1978) on 7 April 1922. They had a son and daughter, but as his son Piers Russell Rea (1925–1934) died young, he was succeeded by Nicolas Rea, the son of his younger brother James Russell Rea (1902–1954).

His daughter, the Hon. Ann Felicity Rea (born 1923) served in the WRNS in the Second World War and married SOE veteran Malcolm Munthe in 1945.

References
Burke's Peerage and Baronetage (105th edition, 1970)

External links 
 

1900 births
1981 deaths
Barons in the Peerage of the United Kingdom
British Army personnel of World War I
British Army personnel of World War II
Grenadier Guards officers
King's Royal Rifle Corps officers
Leaders of the Liberal Party (UK)
Members of the Privy Council of the United Kingdom
People educated at Westminster School, London
Presidents of the Liberal Party (UK)
British Special Operations Executive personnel